WCZU-LD (channel 39) is a low-power television station in Bowling Green, Kentucky, United States, affiliated with Court TV. The station is owned by Innovate Corp. and licensed to its subsidiary DTV America Corporation. WCZU-LD's transmitter is located near Wingfield, in unincorporated southwestern Edmonson County along KY 1749.

History

Construction permit
WCZU-LD's application history dates back to February 2010. The station was assigned call letters W39CZ-D, but in 2013, they were changed to the current WCZU-LD before the station took to the air, under license to King Forward, Inc. Its elected transmitter site was originally located in central Edmonson County, Kentucky, on KY 1365 (Grassland Road) off KY 70 (Morgantown Road) just northwest of Brownsville. That tower served as an AT&T long-lines microwave tower from the early 1970s until the mid 2000s as part of the AT&T Long Lines wire, cable, and microwave relay system. That tower can be seen in various areas of Edmonson County from Windyville to Sweeden as well as the north side of Brownsville, therefore making the structure a familiar landmark to area residents.

WCZU takes to the air

On December 20, 2013, the station's operator, DTV America, announced the station would go on air in early 2014 as a MyNetworkTV affiliate, with Antenna TV programming surrounding MyNetworkTV's prime time schedule. WCZU-LD took to the air on March 4, 2014, and was discovered to be on the air no later than April 26, 2014. Most people did not know the station existed until sometime in either late April or May of that year. Upon signing on, WCZU became the first station in the Bowling Green market to provide programming from a digital multicast specialty network, since the station began with a primary Antenna TV affiliation, with upstart healthy-lifestyle specialty network Doctor TV being carried on WCZU's second subchannel. It also became the first low-power digital station to sign on in the Bowling Green market. In May 2014, WCZU's transmitter site was relocated to a tower near the Wingfield community in southwestern Edmonson County along KY 1749 (Wingfield Road). It now shares space on the tower with Brownsville-licensed adult hits radio station WKLX.

From the time of the station's inception in March 2014, WCZU also had a secondary affiliation with MyNetworkTV, a sister channel to the Fox network that was created in 2006 to provide an alternative to going independent station to any former UPN and WB affiliate not slated to become an affiliate of fellow-upstart network The CW upon its launch that sane year; the cable-only "WBWG", which relaunched onto the DT3 subchannel of ABC/Fox dual affiliate WBKO (channel 13) is the area's CW affiliate as part of The CW Plus. With MyNetworkTV finally becoming available locally through WCZU, Ion Television became the last major network or syndication service not available directly from an outlet in Bowling Green; Nashville's Ion owned-and-operated station WNPX-TV (originally licensed to Cookeville, now licensed to Franklin) is the default Ion outlet for the market. Prior to the sign-on of WCZU, the Bowling Green market had to rely on WUXP-TV in Nashville as the default MyNetworkTV affiliation for area; that station also served as the default UPN affiliate during that network's existence from January 1995 until UPN's merger with The WB to create The CW in September 2006. This was because UPN was never fully available from a local station in Bowling Green; the only UPN programming that was seen locally from Bowling Green area stations were the first season of Star Trek: Voyager, which aired on WBKO in early 1995, and the Disney's One Too block, which aired on NBC affiliate WNKY (channel 40) during that station's final two years as the area's original Fox affiliate. Like most of Nashville's other full-power UHF digital stations, WUXP could still be received in parts of the Bowling Green market using an outdoor antenna. The only Bowling Green area cable system that still carried WUXP is WesternCable, the on-campus cable system in classrooms and residence halls at Western Kentucky University; the station was dropped in 2020.

For unknown reasons, WCZU did not air MyNetworkTV programming in late June and early July 2014. Programming from that service returned sometime during the week of July 7–12, 2014. MyNetworkTV programming returned permanently on August 4, 2014. It disappeared again in March 2015, also for unknown reasons. In times when MyNetworkTV programming was not run on WCZU, WUXP would serve as a backup MyNetworkTV affiliate assuming one could pick up that station's signal.  
  
On August 15, 2014, DTV America, which has been operating the station since its inception, purchased the station from King Forward to become the station's outright owner and operator.

After the first year (2015–2017)
In December 2014, Glasgow, Kentucky-based South Central Rural Telephone Cooperative and DTV America Corporation reached an agreement for the SCRTC to carry both of WCZU's digital subchannels, making WCZU available to the SCRTC's customers in the Bowling Green market only, including Barren, Metcalfe, and Hart counties. This made the SCRTC the first cable provider in the Bowling Green market to reach such an agreement, and to carry either of WCZU's subchannels of the time. Later on in the same month, the Glasgow Electric Plant Board also reached an agreement with DTV America to carry both of WCZU's subchannels. Both providers began carrying WCZU's two subchannels in January 2015. Salem, Indiana-licensed WMYO in Louisville was dropped by both cable providers to make way for WCZU. Since Antenna TV was also available on WCZU's main channel, both subchannels of Louisville Fox affiliate WDRB (WMYO's sister station) were also dropped, making WBKO-DT2 the sole Fox affiliate on Glasgow-area cable. Hence, WCZU-LD claimed market exclusivity on both cable systems in terms of MyNetworkTV affiliates.

On December 8, 2015, WCZU's second digital subchannel replaced DrTV with the Buzzr network, featuring a whole library of classic games shows owned by FremantleMedia. This made WCZU the first station in Kentucky to affiliate with that network. In terms of commercial TV stations, WCZU-LD2's switch to Buzzr was also the first affiliation change in the Bowling Green DMA since WNKY's switchover from Fox to NBC in March 2001. On January 27, 2016, the station launched its DT3 subchannel as an affiliate of Bounce TV, a multicast network that is specifically geared towards the African American population.

On May 27, 2016, after MyNetworkTV's Friday night lineup, DrTV, which once occupied the second subchannel, returned to the station but on the main subchannel as a result of a technical error. Antenna TV returned the following Sunday morning, May 29, in time for that network's marathon of racing-inspired movies that commemorated the 100th running of the Indianapolis 500.

More subchannels on WCZU
There was some speculation that WCZU would launch two additional subchannels, WCZU-LD4 and WCZU-LD5, which would have served as affiliates of Katz Broadcasting-operated gender networks Grit and Escape, respectively, at some point in late 2016 or early 2017. Escape was rebranded as Court TV Mystery in 2019, and was renamed Ion Mystery in 2022. Both networks' channels were considered the "Gender Networks" targeting people in the 25–54 age group. On August 24, 2016, WCZU-LD4, alone, was launched as an affiliate of the SonLife Broadcasting Network, which makes it the first religious network to have an affiliate in the Bowling Green DMA, although WPBM-CD, in nearby Scottsville (technically in the Nashville DMA) is also a religious-formatted station.

Grit and Escape (now Ion Mystery) were launched on WCZU's LD5 and LD6 subchannels, respectively, on September 23, 2016. This made WCZU the first station in the market to offer six or more digital subchannels since Kentucky Educational Television (KET) offered six subchannels on all of their satellites in the mid 2000s. However, the WAVE-DT3 feed of Grit remains available on SCRTC Cable. On January 6, 2017, a seventh subchannel was launched to carry the NBCUniversal-owned Cozi TV network.

WCZU on Spectrum Cable 
The Bowling Green Daily News added WCZU to its TV Listings page on January 9, 2017. This was done in response to Time Warner Cable (now Charter Spectrum) making WCZU's main channel available on its cable system in the Bowling Green area in that month.

Simulcast of another MyNetworkTV affiliate
There were times WCZU did not air MyNetworkTV programming and continued Antenna TV programming during prime time. Since December 2017, as a solution to that problem, WCZU-LD began simulcasting its MyNetworkTV programming schedule with the DT2 subchannel of Rehoboth Beach, Delaware-based NBC affiliate WRDE-LD from 7:00 p.m. to 9:00 p.m. Central time, and also airs its local commercials. This is done to prevent accidental blackout of MyNetworkTV programming due to technical errors. This is part of an agreement between WRDE and DTV America. Since WRDE-LD2 was also a broadcast partner in Raycom Sports' ACC Network, WCZU also aired some Atlantic Coast Conference (ACC) basketball games in prime time as part of the simulcast on weeknights. WYJJ-LD in Jackson, Tennessee and KPJO-LP in the Pittsburg, Kansas–Joplin, Missouri market were following the same practice.

New ownership and change of affiliation
WCZU was one of several dozen DTV America stations that were purchased by HC2 Holdings (now part of Innovate Corp.) in October 2017. In May 2019, WCZU, along with the parent company's other MyNetworkTV affiliates, began to simulcast the service's prime time schedule with KWWE-LD in Lake Charles, Louisiana, including the latter station's commercials. In early June 2019, the station's affiliations with both Antenna TV and MyNetworkTV were replaced with the full-time schedule of the newly relaunched Court TV. The market would be once again without a local MyNetworkTV affiliation until the October 18, 2019 sign-on of the area's current MyNetworkTV/Biz TV dual affiliate, the Glasgow-licensed WDNZ-LD, which has also taken the Antenna TV affiliation to air it on a separate subchannel, thus finally bringing the full-time Antenna TV schedule to the Bowling Green area.

2020s
Throughout its history, WCZU was known to be forced off the air for prolonged periods of time due to either a severe storm or a power outages at the transmitter. However, on July 27, 2022, the station suffered damage to one of the pallets on the transmitter. As a result, the station filed for Silent Special Temporary Authority for allowance of time to repair the transmitter.  The station returned to the air on August 15.

Programming
Local advertising is not currently aired by the station as WCZU airs the direct network feeds. The station relies on national advertising aired by the networks for revenue. As a MyNetworkTV affiliate in the 2010s, during weeknight prime time hours, the slots where local advertising was supposed to be inserted, it aired the MyNetworkTV logo bouncing around until the commercial break was over. At the top of every hour on both subchannels, programming is preempted for five seconds to show the station's legal top-of-hour identification, though it only affects the closing and/or intro of programs or any promo that is run between programs. In spite of its low-power status, until June 2015 the station identifications list the station as "WCZU-TV 39, Bowling Green." It was replaced by a new station ID with the proper "-LD" suffix.

General programming 
From 2014 until 2019, WCZU-LD cleared the full Antenna TV programming schedule for both days of the weekend, and 22 hours every weekday. Most of Antenna TV's programming features classic sitcoms from the 1950s through the 1990s. Any Antenna TV programs that air on weeknights from 7:00 p.m. to 9:00 p.m. CT are preempted in order to accommodate the MyNetworkTV programming schedule, which runs from 7:00 to 9:00 p.m. CT every weeknight, and would re-join Antenna TV at 9:00 p.m. This practice was also followed by sister stations and fellow MyNetworkTV/Antenna TV dual affiliates WYJJ-LD and KPJO-LD, as those stations had the same affiliations. Reception of WUXP was still necessary to view MyNetworkTV's programming in high-definition, because WCZU's entire broadcasting schedule was aired in standard definition to accommodate Antenna TV's picture format. Since June 2019, the station clears the Court TV schedule in full 16:9 high definition.

Sports programming 
A December 2014 article in the Glasgow Daily Times speculated that WCZU was expected to broadcast Atlantic Coast Conference sports programming from the Raycom Sports-operated ACC Network, because the University of Louisville Cardinals joined the ACC in July 2014.
The rumors proved to be true on August 29, 2015 at 1:00 p.m. CT, when the station aired the ACC Football Kickoff Special. At some point in early 2015, Raycom Sports and DTV America reached an agreement to bring ACC football and basketball to WCZU. This also made Raycom's ACC Network the station's only syndicated fare that does not come from its MyNetworkTV or Antenna TV network affiliations. ACC Network programming on WCZU was broadcast in standard definition, but in a 16:9 letterbox widescreen format. Prior to the 2014–15 season, since none of the Bowling Green area's local stations carried ACC Network programming, ACC fans in the area had to rely on either Nashville's WUXP or Louisville's NBC affiliate WAVE-TV, or ESPN's out-of-market sports packages and/or the ESPN3 online-streaming service to access those broadcasts. The first football game broadcast on WCZU was the Wofford–Clemson game on September 5, 2015. MyNetworkTV programming on WCZU was subject to be preempted by ACC Network games during college basketball season. ACC Network programming remained with WCZU until the end of the 2018–19 regular season; it ceased to exist after the July 2019 launch of ESPN's ACC cable network.

WCZU-LD2
WCZU-LD2, the second digital sub-channel previously served as an affiliate of the now-defunct Doctor Television Channel, which aired health and fitness-oriented programming, four hours worth of children's educational programming, and a two-hour period of meditation programming from The Worship Network during the overnight hours. On November 8, 2015, WCZU-LD2 became affiliated with Buzzr, a multicast network that mainly airs Fremantle-owned classic game shows.

Technical information

Subchannels
The station's digital signal is multiplexed:

Digital signal reallocation
As part of the 2016-17 spectrum incentive auction, in April 2018, WCZU applied to reallocate its digital signal to UHF channel 34 as its initial channel 39 allocation was one of the upper-mid UHF channels (38–51) that was removed from the use of television allocation. That part of the spectrum will be used for wireless services. WCZU also applied to boost its effective radiated power to 15,000 watts, the maximum allowable power by a low-power station. In October 2018, WCZU reapplied its reallocation/construction permit to relocate to UHF channel 19. The station’s over-the-air signal temporarily went off the air on October 18, 2019 in order to undergo maintenance to test the new signal. The station returned to the air on its new allocation on channel 19 in November 2019; meanwhile, the channel 34 allocation that the station initially applied for would be used by what would eventually become Telemundo affiliate WBGS-LD.

Availability

Over-the-air signal
Due to its low-powered status, and with its 15,000 watts of effective radiated power, WCZU's signal can only cover a  radius around the transmitter. It covers most of the Bowling Green DMA, which comprises Barren, Butler, Edmonson, Hart, Metcalfe, and Warren Counties. In addition to the Bowling Green market, WCZU can also cover parts of Logan, Simpson, and Allen counties, along with far northern parts of Sumner County, Tennessee, which are in the Nashville DMA, along with Grayson County in the Louisville media market, as well as southern Ohio County, which is in the Evansville, IN/Owensboro, KY media market.

Cable carriage
In Barren, Hart, and Metcalfe Counties, the main channel is available on SCRTC Cable channel 30, while WCZU-LD2 is on channel 91. In the city of Glasgow, the main channel is carried on Glasgow Electric Plant Board cable channel 15, while WCZU-LD2 is carried on Glasgow EPB Cable Channel 146.

After DTV America's agreement with Charter Spectrum to carry the station's main channel in January 2017, this leaves the market's Mediacom systems and Dish Network as the only pay-television providers in the market that still do not carry WCZU. DirecTV does not offer any of Bowling Green's local channels. The station lost must-carry status following the main channel's switch to Court TV.

References

External links

Station webpage by DTV America (Archived January 14, 2015 at the Wayback Machine) 

  

 

Court TV affiliates
Buzzr affiliates
Bounce TV affiliates
Grit (TV network) affiliates
Ion Mystery affiliates
Cozi TV affiliates
Low-power television stations in the United States
Innovate Corp.
Edmonson County, Kentucky
CZU-LD
Television channels and stations established in 2014
2014 establishments in Kentucky